"Duet" is a song by British indie pop band Everything Everything. The track was released in the United Kingdom on 24 March 2013 as the third single from the band's second studio album, Arc (2013). The track received its first play on 8 January 2013, with Arc having been selected as BBC Radio 1 DJ Zane Lowe's Album of the Week. The single's B-side "+Pendolino" served as the band's first official instrumental track, having been originally recorded in 2011.

Track listing

Credits and personnel
Recording and mixing
Recorded at RAK Studios, London; Angelic Studios, Halse; Muttley Ranch, London; Jonathan's Flat, Manchester; The Garden, London; Crotch Int. Studios, Gilsland mixed at Muttley Ranch, London.

Personnel

Songwriting - Jonathan Higgs
Production - David Kosten, Everything Everything
Recording - Mo Hauseler, Tom A.D. Fuller, David Kosten
Assistant Engineering - Mike Horner, Pete Prokopiw

Mixing - David Kosten
Mastering - John Davis (at Metropolis Mastering)
Instrumentation - Jonathan Higgs, Jeremy Pritchard, Alex Robertshaw, Michael Spearman

Credits adapted from the liner notes of Arc, RCA Records, UMP.

Release history

References

2013 singles
Everything Everything songs
RCA Records singles
2013 songs
Songs written by Jonathan Higgs